The 2009 Collector Swedish Open was a tennis tournament played on outdoor clay courts. It was the 1st edition of the Collector Swedish Open. It took place in Båstad, Sweden, from 6 July through 11 July 2009 for the women and from 13 July through 19 July 2009 for the men. Robin Söderling and María José Martínez Sánchez won the singles title.

WTA entrants

Seeds

Seedings are based on the rankings of June 22, 2009.

Other entrants
The following players received wildcards into the singles main draw

  Ellen Allgurin
  Johanna Larsson
  Sandra Roma

The following players received entry from the qualifying draw:
  Ksenia Palkina
  Michaela Johansson
  Julia Vakulenko
  Irina Buryachok

ATP entrants

Seeds

Seedings are based on the rankings of July 6, 2009.

Other entrants
The following players received wildcards into the singles main draw

  Daniel Berta
  Andreas Vinciguerra
  Grigor Dimitrov

The following players received entry from the qualifying draw:
  Peter Luczak
  Guillermo Cañas
  Potito Starace
  Daniel Gimeno-Traver

Finals

Men's singles

 Robin Söderling defeated  Juan Mónaco, 6–3, 7–6(7–4)
 It was Söderling's first title of the year and 4th of his career.

Women's singles

 María José Martínez Sánchez defeated  Caroline Wozniacki  7–5, 6–4
It was Martínez Sánchez's second title of the year and career.

Men's doubles

 Jaroslav Levinský /  Filip Polášek defeated  Robin Söderling /  Robert Lindstedt, 1–6, 6–3, [10–7]

Women's doubles

 Gisela Dulko /  Flavia Pennetta defeated  Nuria Llagostera Vives /  María José Martínez Sánchez, 6–2, 0–6, [10–6]

External links
Official website

Swedish Open
Swedish Open
2009
Swedish Open
Swedish Open